Linheraptor is a genus of dromaeosaurid dinosaur which lived in what is now China in the Late Cretaceous. It was named by Xu Xing and colleagues in 2010, and contains the species Linheraptor exquisitus. This bird-like dinosaur was less than 2 m (6.5 ft) long and was found in Inner Mongolia. It is known from a single, nearly complete skeleton.

Discovery
Researchers announced the discovery of the genus after a nearly complete fossilised skeleton was found in 2008 by Jonah N. Choiniere and Michael Pittman in Inner Mongolia; a more detailed publication is forthcoming. The specimen was recovered from rocks at Bayan Mandahu that belong to the Wulansuhai Formation. The latter includes lithologies that are very similar to the Mongolian Campanian-aged rocks of the Djadokhta Formation which have yielded the closely related dromaeosaurids Tsaagan and Velociraptor.  The holotype specimen of Linheraptor, articulated and uncompressed, is one of the few nearly complete skeletons of dromaeosaurid dinosaurs worldwide. The name of the genus refers to the district of Linhe, Inner Mongolia, China where the specimen was discovered, while the specific name, exquisitus, refers to the well-preserved nature of the holotype (IVPP V 16923).

Description
 
Linheraptor was a bird-like theropod dinosaur. At that size, Linheraptor would have been a fast and agile predator, perhaps preying on small ceratopsians. Like all dromaeosaurids, it had an elongated skull, a curved neck, an enlarged toe claw on each foot, and a long tail; Linheraptor was bipedal and carnivorous. The large toe claws may have been used for capturing prey.

Taxonomy

Among its sister taxa, Linheraptor is believed to be most closely related to Tsaagan mangas. Linheraptor and Tsaagan were intermediate between basal and derived dromaeosaurids. The two share several skull details, among which a large maxillary fenestra — an opening in the maxilla, an upper jaw bone —  and lack various features of more derived dromaeosaurids such as Velociraptor. Senter (2011) and Turner, Makovicky and Norell (2012) argue that Linheraptor exquisitus is a junior synonym of Tsaagan mangas, but Xu, Pittman et al. (2015) reject this synonymy by responding to the counterarguments proposed using new and existing details of Linheraptor'''s anatomy. A monographic description of Linheraptor'' is currently in preparation.

See also

 Timeline of dromaeosaurid research

References

External links
Fossil of Linheraptor.
Life restoration of Linheraptor exquisitus by paleoartist Julius T. Csotonyi

Late Cretaceous dinosaurs of Asia
Eudromaeosaurs
Fossil taxa described in 2010
Taxa named by Mark Norell